Xenomyrmex floridanus is a species of ant in the family Formicidae.

Subspecies
These two subspecies belong to the species Xenomyrmex floridanus:
 Xenomyrmex floridanus floridanus Emery, 1895 i c
 Xenomyrmex floridanus skwarrae Wheeler, 1931 i c
Data sources: i = ITIS, c = Catalogue of Life, g = GBIF, b = Bugguide.net

References

Further reading

External links

 

Myrmicinae
Articles created by Qbugbot
Insects described in 1895